Abhishek Halder (born 5 October 1999) is an Indian professional footballer who plays as a midfielder for Mohammedan in the I-League.

Career
Halder began his career as part of the FC Pune City Academy set up. In November 2017, Halder was selected to play for the Indian Arrows, an All India Football Federation-owned team that would consist of India under-20 players to give them playing time. He made his professional debut for the side on 18 December 2017 against Minerva Punjab. He started and played the whole match as Indian Arrows lost 1–0.

Mohammedan
In December 2021, Mohammedan added Halder to their roster ahead of the season. On 3 March, he made his debut for the club against Aizawl on the league's return after the COVID-19 breakout, in a 2–0 win.

In June 2022, Halder signed a new two-year deal with Mohammedan. He scored his first goal for the club on 21 August against Jamshedpur in the Durand Cup, which ended in a dominating 3–0 win. He played a lovely 1-2 with Marcus Joseph to finish with a wonderful volley chipping over the keeper to double the lead.

Career statistics

Club

References

1999 births
Living people
People from West Bengal
Indian footballers
FC Pune City players
Indian Arrows players
Association football midfielders
Footballers from West Bengal
I-League players
India youth international footballers
Hyderabad FC players
Indian Super League players
I-League 2nd Division players
Mohammedan SC (Kolkata) players